Freaked Out and Small is the third studio album by the American alternative rock band The Presidents of the United States of America. It was released in 2000 by MUSICBLITZ Records, which was a web based label. Copies of the album distributed through MUSICBLITZ included in the liner notes a special thanks to anyone who pre-ordered it from the MUSICBLITZ website. These fans are listed individually, by name.

An interesting note about this album is that all of the songs were played with normal guitars and bass guitars in standard tuning. This is different from all of the other albums by the band, as they usually played with guitbasses and basitars, which are modified guitars with fewer strings that are tuned to Drop D flat tuning (i.e. tuned to Drop D, then tuned a semitone lower).

This album was re-released in 2004 on the band's own label, PUSA Inc. with bonus tracks that included demos of 8 of the 12 songs on the album, as well as 2 other songs, as Chris Ballew originally recorded them between 1989 and 1996.

Tab Book/DVD
In 2001, a tab book was released for the album that included a DVD of the entire album performed live.

Track listing
All songs by Chris Ballew unless otherwise noted.

Re-release bonus tracks
"Velvet Universe" – 2:40
"Hand in Hand" – 2:11
"Tiny Explosions (demo)" – 3:13
"Nuthin But Love (demo)" – 2:27
"Tiger Bomb (demo)" – 3:24
"Last Girl On Earth (demo)" – 3:03
"Meanwhile Back in the City (demo)" – 3:13
"Jupiter (demo)" – 3:24
"Death Star (demo)" – 3:03
"Blank Baby (demo)" – 3:22

Most of these tracks were recorded in 1996 except for tracks 19 and 22, recorded in 1989.

Personnel
 Chris Ballew – vocals, bass
 Dave Dederer – guitar, vocals
 Jason Finn – drums, percussion
 Duff McKagan – bass on "I'm Mad"

References

External links
 

2000 albums
Albums produced by Martin Feveyear
The Presidents of the United States of America (band) albums